Antonio Alandy Ferrer, also known as "Ony" Ferrer, is the current congressman of the 6th district of the Province of Cavite and a former mayor of General Trias. He is the brother of former 6th district representative and current city mayor Luis Ferrer IV.

Life and career
His father is Luis S. Ferrer III, a former provincial Vice-Governor. His grandfather, Luis Y. Ferrer Jr., and great-grandfather, Luis O. Ferrer Sr. were former governors of Cavite.

He finished his tertiary education at De La Salle University in Manila, earning Bachelor of Arts major in Political Science majors. He also graduated with Laws at University of the East, also in Manila. In 1994, he passed the Philippine Bar Examinations and became an attorney. He became legal researcher, legal assistant and legal officer of Duty-Free Philippines from 1993 to 1998. Then he became legal counsel, manager and economic zone manager.

Electoral history
After the enactment of RA 9727 establishing the legislative districts of Cavite, he ran for congressman in the 2010 elections under Lakas-Kampi-CMD and as an adopted candidate of the Nacionalista Party. He won as the first representative of Cavite's 6th district, garnering 108,574 votes against former Tanza mayor and Games and Amusement Board Chairman Hermogenes "Ashley" Arayata, Jr., who garnered 63,951 votes.

Ferrer ran for a mayoralty position in the 2013 midterm elections, alongside his brother Luis who ran as a 6th District representative, under the National Unity Party ticket which caucused from old party, Lakas. Both of them won in their respective positions, with Antonio earning 46,575 votes against Liberal Party candidate and former vice-mayor Fernando "Totie" Campaña.

Ferrer is the first city mayor of General Trias, following a cityhood referendum held in December 12, 2015.

Ferrer ran for a second term as mayor in the 2016 general elections, earning 70,997 votes over Nationalist People's Coalition candidate Annalyn Jubilio. This will also serve as his first full term as city mayor.

Personal life
He is married to Anna Lisa Alcantara and has three children.

References

De La Salle University alumni
Living people
Lakas–CMD politicians
Mayors of places in Cavite
Members of the House of Representatives of the Philippines from Cavite
National Unity Party (Philippines) politicians
Year of birth missing (living people)